Giffin is a surname. Notable people with the surname include: 

D. Logan Giffin (1890–1980), American lawyer and politician
David Giffin (born 1973), Australian rugby player
Emily Giffin (born 1972), American author
Fred Giffin (1920–1999), Australian weightlifter
Gordon Giffin (born 1949), American diplomat
Lee Giffin (born 1967), American ice hockey player
Merritt Giffin (1887–1911), American athlete
Michael Giffin (born 1984), Canadian football player
Roger Giffin, English luthier
Ron Giffin (1942–2021), Canadian lawyer and politician
Simon Osborn Giffin (1870–1935), Canadian merchant and politician

See also
Giffin House, a historic house in New Hampshire, US